"Katie Cruel" is a traditional American folksong, likely of Scottish origin.  As a traditional song, it has been recorded by many performers, but the best known recording of the song is by Karen Dalton on the album In My Own Time.  The American version of the song is said to date to the Revolutionary War period.  The song is Roud no. 1645.

Lyrics

The American lyrics appear to contain an oblique story of regret.  As given in Eloise Hubbard Linscott's The Folk Songs of Old New England, the full lyrics are:

Origins
The opening verse of the song bears a strong resemblance to the Scottish song, Licht Bob's Lassie, whose opening verses mirror the song in both notional content and form:

Licht Bob's Lassie would appear to tell a story about a camp follower or sex worker:

The imagery about dyeing petticoats is shared by the Irish Gaelic lament Siúil A Rúin.

Performances
Dalton's performance of the song is perhaps the best known.  About her version, Stephen Thompson has written that "It's unsettling to hear Dalton, who died homeless and haunted, sing of bridges burned and backs turned."

Jerry Garcia also performed the song, as have a number of other performers, including Peggy Seeger, Sandy Paton, the New Christy Minstrels ("Miss Katy Cruel", 1965), Odetta, Robin Pecknold (Fleet Foxes), Gingerthistle, Linda Thompson, Moira Smiley, Allysen Callery, Molly Tuttle(The Tuttles and AJ Lee), Joe Dassin and Bert Jansch (with Beth Orton and Devendra Banhart). Cordelia's Dad recorded the song on their 1995 release, Comet. The Demon Barbers also recorded the song on their 2002 album Uncut. White Magic started covering the song live in 2004, and released it as a single in 2006. French singer and actress Marie Laforêt recorded English and French versions of the song in the 1960s. The Owl Service recorded a version of the song on their album A Garland of Song.

Agnes Obel did a version in 2011. The song also features on Raise Ravens, a 2011 release by Glasgow-based John Knox Sex Club who have brought together elements of both versions of the song.  The song also features on Lady Maisery's second album, Mayday (released in 2013). Lisa LeBlanc recorded a version of the song on the album Highways, Heartaches and Time Well Wasted in 2014. Rillian and the Doxie Chicks, a Los Angele-based, pirate-themed folk band, also released a version of the song on their second CD Left in the Longboat''' in 2011.

The song "When I First Came to Town" by Nick Cave and the Bad Seeds, from their 1992 album Henry's Dream, was adapted from Dalton's version of "Katy Cruel" though rewritten from the perspective of a male narrator. The song was also recorded by the Irish band Lankum on their 2019 album The Livelong Day''.

References

American folk songs